is an electoral district of the Japanese House of Representatives, the lower house of the National Diet. The district was created as part of the general move from multi-member districts to single-member districts in the House of Representatives.

Areas Covered

Current District 
As of 2 February 2023, the areas covered by this district are as follows:

 Nagaoka
 Kashiwazaki
 Ojiya
 Mitsuke
 Santō District
 Kariwa District

After the abolition of the 6th district, the districts boundaries changed significantly, it was moved to areas formely covered by the 2nd and 5th districts.

Areas from 2013-2022 
From the first redistricting in 2013 until the second redistricting in 2022, the areas covered by this district are as follows:

 Niigata (city)
 Parts of Kita (Former town of Yokogoshi: due to the small number of eligible voters, their votes were also counted in Kōnan ward)
 Central government office (Kosugi, Junimae and Yokogoe areas)
 Parts of Higashi (former town of Kameda, however there are no voters within)
 Kameda Nakajima 4 within the Ishiyama branch office jurisdiction
 Parts of Chūō (former town of Kameda, however there are no voters within)
 Parts of Kōnan (former towns of Yokogoshi and Kameda)
 Akiha
 Minami (forme city limits of Shirone)
 Nagaoka (former city of Tochio and the former town of Nakanoshima
 Tochio branch jurisdiction
 Nakanoshima Branch jurisdiction (Oshikirigawara, excluding the  
 Sanjō
 Kamo
 Mitsuke
 Minamikanbara District

Areas from before 2013 
From 1996 until the first redistricting in 2013, the areas covered by this district were as follows:

 Sanjo City
 Niitsu City
 Kamo City
 Mitsuke City
 Tochio City
 Shirane City
 Nakakanbara District
 Kosudo
 Yokogoshi
 Kameda
 Minamikabara District

In 2002, the redistricting didn't change the borders of the district, but did change the official designation of Yokogoshi to recognise its official incorporation as a town in between the creation of the district and the redistricting.

History

Elected Representatives

Election Results 
‡ - Also ran for a seat in the Hokuriku Shinetsu PR block

‡‡ - also rand for and won in the  Hokuriku Shinetsu PR block

Elections in the 2020s

Elections in the 2010s

Elections in the 2000s

Elections in the 1990s

References 

Districts in Niigata Prefecture
House of Representatives (Japan)